Simon Boypa (born 19 March 1999) is a French sprinter who specializes in the 400 metres. He won a bronze medal in the 4×400 m relay at the 2022 European Athletics Championships.

References

External links
 

1999 births
Living people
French male sprinters
Sportspeople from Paris
European Athletics Championships medalists
21st-century French people